Fat hydrogenation is the process of combining fat – typically liquid vegetable oils – with hydrogen, to convert some or all of the unsaturated fat into saturated fat, resulting in a solid or semi-solid fat.

Changing the degree of saturation of the fat changes some important physical properties, such as the melting range, which is why liquid oils become semi-solid. Solid or semi-solid fats are preferred for baking because the way the fat mixes with flour produces a more desirable texture in the baked product. Because partially hydrogenated vegetable oils are cheaper than animal fats, are available in a wide range of consistencies, and have other desirable characteristics such as increased oxidative stability and longer shelf life, they are the predominant fats used as shortening in most commercial baked goods.

The process is typically carried out at very high pressure, with the help of a nickel catalyst that is removed from the final product.

Process
Hydrogenating vegetable oil is done by raising a blend of vegetable oil and a metal catalyst, typically nickel, in near-vacuum to very high temperatures, and introducing hydrogen. This causes the carbon atoms of the oil to break double-bonds with other carbons. Each carbon atom becomes single-bonded to an individual hydrogen atom, and the double bond between carbons can no longer exist. 

Full hydrogenation results in the conversion of all of the unsaturated fats into saturated fats by transforming all of the double bonds in the fat into single bonds. Partial hydrogenation reduces some, but not all, of the double bonds by the partial replacement with single bonds. The degree of hydrogenation is controlled by restricting the amount of hydrogen, reaction temperature and time, and the catalyst.

Issues
Cis–trans isomerization of some of the remaining unsaturated carbon bonds to their trans isomers during the hydrogenation process produces trans fat, which have been demonstrated to have cardiovascular health risk. The conversion from cis to trans bonds is chemically favored because the trans configuration has lower energy than the natural cis one. At equilibrium, the trans/cis isomer ratio is about 2:1. 

Numerous studies have concluded that these trans fatty acids have negative health effects.  As a result, many countries have enacted trans fat regulation that aims to eliminate or severely restrict their amount in industrialized food products, such as mandatory labeling of trans fats on food products. The United States Food and Drug Administration has concluded that partially hydrogenated oils are not generally recognized as safe, and since 2018 categorizes them as food additives, not food.

Dietary recommendations
Many health organizations recommend limiting or replacing dietary intake of trans fats and saturated fats, in favor of unsaturated fats:

History

 Nobel laureate  Paul Sabatier worked in the late 1890s to develop the chemistry of hydrogenation. Whereas Sabatier considered hydrogenation of only vapors, the German chemist Wilhelm Normann showed in 1901 that liquid oils could be hydrogenated, and patented the process in 1902. Normann's hydrogenation process made it possible to stabilize affordable whale oil or fish oil for human consumption, a practice kept secret to avoid consumer distaste. During the years 1905–1910, Normann built a fat-hardening facility in the Herford company. At the same time, the invention was extended to a large-scale plant in Warrington, England, at Joseph Crosfield & Sons, Limited. It took only two years until the hardened fat could be successfully produced in the plant in Warrington, commencing production in late 1909. The initial year's production totalled nearly 3,000 tonnes.

In 1909, Procter & Gamble acquired the United States rights to the Normann patent. In 1911, they began marketing the first hydrogenated shortening, Crisco, composed largely of partially hydrogenated cottonseed oil. Further success came from the marketing technique of giving away free cookbooks in which every recipe called for Crisco.

In the early 20th century, soybeans began to be imported into the United States as a source of protein; large quantities of soybean oil were a by-product. At the same time, there was not enough butterfat available for consumers. Margarine manufacturers found that hydrogenated fats worked better than the previously used combination of animal and liquid vegetable fats. Margarine made from hydrogenated soybean oil and vegetable shortenings such as Crisco and Spry, sold in England, began to replace butter and lard in baking bread, pies, cookies, and cakes by 1920.

Production of hydrogenated fats increased steadily until the 1960s, as processed vegetable fats replaced animal fats in the United States and other Western countries. At first, the argument was a financial one due to lower costs; advocates also said that the hydrogenated fats of margarine were healthier than the saturated fats of butter.

The food industry has moved away from partially hydrogenated fats in response to the health concerns about trans fats, labeling requirements, and removal of trans fats from permitted food additives. They have been replaced with fully hydrogenated fats, vegetable oils that are naturally higher in saturated fat and therefore more solid at room temperature, such as palm oil and coconut oil, and interesterified fats, which cannot result in the formation of trans fats.

See also
 Hydrotreated vegetable oil

References

External links